The American Way is the second studio album by American thrash metal band Sacred Reich, released on May 15, 1990 via Metal Blade Records. The video for "The American Way" was used in the 1992 film Encino Man. The album debuted at No. 153 on September 1, 1990 on the Billboard 200 charts, lasting for nine weeks. An enhanced remastered version released in 2009 contains pre-production demo recordings and a free patch. A second remastered version released that year contains the same songs plus "The American Way" promo video CD-ROM. The American Way is also Sacred Reich's final full-length studio album with drummer Greg Hall, who left the band in 1991.

Overview
Although the band had maintained a record of at least one release per year since their debut, Ignorance, this was their first full-length album for three years and also the first to show a musical progression from the all-out thrash metal which dominated their earlier material. Phil Rind, in the liner notes, explains the band's change in musical direction thus:
"Musically, we've tried to expand our horizons without forgetting our roots. Some people will appreciate the changes. Others, let's just say, they'd be satisfied with 'Ignorance II'"
The last track "31 Flavors" is a funk rock song.

Track listing

Credits
 Phil Rind – bass, vocals
 Wiley Arnett – lead guitar
 Jason Rainey – rhythm guitar
 Greg Hall – drums
 The Unity Horns – horns on "31 Flavors"
Tony Brewster – trumpet
Will Donato – saxophone
Tim Moynahan – trombone
 Recorded and mixed in 1989-1990 in California, U.S. at Cornerstone Recorders with additional recording at Track Records
 Produced by Bill Metoyer and Sacred Reich
 Engineered by Bill Metoyer
 Assistant engineered by Scott Campbell
 Cover illustration by Paul Stottler

Charts

References

External links
Sacred Reich Official Website

1990 albums
Sacred Reich albums
Metal Blade Records albums